The East Portland Community Center is a community center in Mill Park, Portland, Oregon, United States.

Description and history
Funded by a bond measure, the center was established in 1998. In 2009, an aquatic center was added and Bruce West's sculpture Sitting Stones was installed outside the building. The center features two indoor pools. The E205 Initiative Projects, completed in 2013, resulted in the construction of play structures for children at the center.

The center has been used as a temporary homeless shelter.

Charles Jordan has been credited for helping to develop the center.

References

External links

 

1998 establishments in Oregon
Buildings and structures completed in 1998
Buildings and structures in Portland, Oregon
Community centers in the United States
Southeast Portland, Oregon